Issaqueena Falls, near Walhalla, South Carolina, is a  high cascade waterfall in the Oconee District of the Sumter National Forest. 

The falls are named for a legendary Cherokee girl who is said to have leaped from the top of the falls with her lover, either an Oconee brave, a white trader named Allan Francis, or a white silversmith named David Francis. In the story, Issaqueena and her lover either die together or they land on a ledge out of sight of hostile tribesmen and eventually live happily ever after.

The waterfall is close to another notable local landmark, Stumphouse Tunnel, and a park provides access to both.

References

Waterfalls of South Carolina
Protected areas of Oconee County, South Carolina
Sumter National Forest
Landforms of Oconee County, South Carolina